Fit for an Autopsy is an American deathcore band from Jersey City, New Jersey, formed in 2008. The band consists of guitarists Pat Sheridan, Will Putney and Tim Howley, drummer Josean Orta, vocalist Joe Badolato, and bassist Peter "Blue" Spinazola. They are currently signed to Nuclear Blast and have released six studio albums since formation.

History 
The band released their first demo in 2008, followed a year later by the group's first EP, Hell on Earth. In 2011, Fit for an Autopsy released their debut studio album, The Process of Human Extermination.

In September 2013, the band released their second studio album, Hellbound. Less than a year later, in April 2014, the band announced that vocalist Nate Johnson would be leaving the band. Greg Wilburn of the Devastated was immediately named as Johnson's temporary replacement.

In early 2015, the band announced the departure of Greg Wilburn and the addition of their new vocalist, Joe Badolato. Along with this, they announced that they were in the writing process for a new album. This third studio album, named Absolute Hope Absolute Hell, was released on October 2, 2015.

In July 2016, the band announced a split-EP, named The Depression Sessions, with fellow deathcore bands Thy Art Is Murder and The Acacia Strain. The EP was released on August 12, 2016.

The band released a new song, "Heads Will Hang", from their fourth studio album The Great Collapse on January 31, 2017. The album was released on March 17, 2017. On May 8, 2018, Fit For An Autopsy announced they signed with Nuclear Blast.

On October 25, 2019, the band released their fifth studio album The Sea of Tragic Beasts through Nuclear Blast.

On April 6, 2020, the band released a standalone single "Fear Tomorrow" through Nuclear Blast.

On September 22, 2021, the band announced their new sixth studio album Oh What the Future Holds. Two days later, they released the album's first single "Far from Heaven". The song was later elected by Loudwire as the 35th best metal song of 2021. The album was released on January 14, 2022. Loudwire later noted Oh What the Future Holds as one of the Best Rock + Metal Albums of 2022.

On June 6, 2022, the band announced their invitation to tour with Lamb of God and Killswitch Engage as part of the Omens Tour.

Members 
Current members
 Pat Sheridan – guitars, backing vocals 
 Will Putney – guitars ; bass 
 Josean Orta – drums 
 Tim Howley – guitars 
 Joe Badolato – lead vocals 
 Peter "Blue" Spinazola – bass 

Former members
 Brian Mathis – drums 
 Nate Johnson – lead vocals 
 Greg Wilburn – lead vocals 

Touring members
 Seth Coleman – bass 
 Charlie Busacca – bass 
 Shane Slade – bass 
 Davier Pérez – drums 

Timeline

Discography 
Studio albums

EPs

References

External links 

2008 establishments in New Jersey
American deathcore musical groups
Heavy metal musical groups from New Jersey
Long Branch Records artists
Musical groups established in 2008
Musical quintets
Nuclear Blast artists